The Hotel Campo Imperatore, also known as Albergo di Campo Imperatore, is a hotel on top of Campo Imperatore at  altitude on the slopes of , in the massif of Gran Sasso d'Italia, within the municipality of L'Aquila.

It was designed in the 1930s by Italian engineer .

The structure is famous for having been Benito Mussolini's prison between August 28 and September 12, 1943, following the armistice of Cassibile, until his liberation by the German paratroopers as part the Gran Sasso raid. Today, it is the main lodging for the ski resort of the same name, and a starting point for hiking on the western side of the Gran Sasso.

See also

References 

Hotels in Italy
Hotels established in 1934
Hotel buildings completed in 1934